Pilocarpus is a genus of about 13 species of plants belonging to the family Rutaceae, native to the Neotropics of South America. Various species are important pharmacologically as a source of the parasympathomimetic alkaloid pilocarpine. Many of the species have the common name jaborandi.

Etymology
The taxonomic name Pilocarpus is derived from ancient Greek πῖλος wool, felt + καρπός fruit.

Species
Selected species
Pilocarpus jaborandi (Pernambuco jaborandi)
Pilocarpus microphyllus (Maranham jaborandi)
Pilocarpus racemosus (Guadeloupe jaborandi)
Pilocarpus pennatifolius (Paraguay jaborandi)
Pilocarpus spicatus (Aracati jaborandi)

References

External links
Germplasm Resources Information Network: Pilocarpus

Zanthoxyloideae
Taxa named by Martin Vahl
Zanthoxyloideae genera